Podalia pedacioides is a moth in the Megalopygidae family. It was described by Paul Dognin in 1916.

References

Moths described in 1916
Megalopygidae